A bromophenol is any organobromide of phenol that contains one or more covalently bonded bromine atoms. There are five basic types of bromophenols (mono- to pentabromophenol) and 19 different bromophenols in total when positional isomerism is taken into account. Bromophenols are produced by electrophilic halogenation of phenol with bromine.

List of bromophenols 
There is a total of 19 bromophenols, corresponding to the different ways in which bromine atoms can be attached to the five carbon atoms in the benzene ring of the phenol molecule, excluding the carbon atom to which the hydroxy group is attached.  

Monobromrophenols have three isomers because there is only one bromine atom that can occupy one of three ring positions on the phenol molecule; 2-bromophenol, for example, is the isomer that has a bromine atom in the ortho position. Pentabromophenol, by contrast, has only one isomer because all five available ring positions on the phenol are fully brominated.
 Monobromophenol (3 positional isomers)
 2-Bromophenol
 3-Bromophenol
 4-Bromophenol
 Dibromophenol (6 positional isomers)
 2,3-Dibromophenol
 2,4-Dibromophenol
 2,5-Dibromophenol
 2,6-Dibromophenol 
 3,4-Dibromophenol
 3,5-Dibromophenol
 Tribromophenol (6 positional isomers)
 2,3,4-Tribromophenol
 2,3,5-Tribromophenol
 2,3,6-Tribromophenol
 2,4,5-Tribromophenol
 2,4,6-Tribromophenol
 3,4,5-Tribromophenol
 Tetrabromophenol (3 positional isomers)
 2,3,4,5-Tetrabromophenol
 2,3,4,6-Tetrabromophenol
 2,3,5,6-Tetrabromophenol
 Pentabromophenol (1 positional isomer)

See also
 Chlorophenol
Iodophenol

References

Bromoarenes
Phenols